The discography of Atlanta-based rapper 21 Savage consists of two studio albums, three collaborative albums, two mixtapes, three extended plays, and 30 singles (including 15 as a featured artist).
 
On July 15, 2016, Savage released his collaborative extended play with Metro Boomin, Savage Mode, which reached number 23 on the Billboard 200, marking his first project to chart. It produced the Billboard Hot 100 top-40 single, "X", which features Future, and single "No Heart". 

On July 7, 2017, Savage released his debut studio album, Issa Album, which hit number 2 on the Billboard 200. It produced the top-20 single, "Bank Account". On October 31, 2017, he released a collaborative studio album with Offset and Metro Boomin, Without Warning, which peaked at number four on the Billboard 200.  

On December 21, 2018, Savage released his second studio album, I Am > I Was, which debuted atop the Billboard 200, serving as his first chart-topping album. It produced the top-20 single, "A Lot", and single "Monster", which feature J. Cole and Childish Gambino, respectively. On October 2, 2020, he released his second collaborative studio album with Metro Boomin, Savage Mode II, which also serves as his second chart-topping album, that too, consecutively. It produced the top-10 singles, "Runnin" and "Mr. Right Now", the latter of which features Drake. On May 14, 2021, Savage released his third extended play, Spiral: From the Book of Saw Soundtrack, a soundtrack from the 2021 film, Spiral. That same day, he released a collaboration with J. Cole and Morray, "My Life", which debuted and peaked at number two on the Hot 100, serving as his highest-charting single as a lead artist on the Hot 100. In 2022, he released a collaboration with the late King Von, "Don't Play That", which debuted and peaked at number 40 on the Hot 100. On November 4, 2022, Savage released a collaborative studio album with Drake, Her Loss. It produced the top-10 single, "Circo Loco", which debuted and peaked at number seven on the Hot 100. The album also includes six more top-10 songs. Later that year, he released a collaboration with Metro Boomin and the Weeknd, "Creepin'", which reached number three on the Hot 100 the following year.
 
Savage has also received commercial success from songs that he is featured on. In 2016, he appeared on Drake's single, "Sneakin'", which reached number 28 on the Billboard Hot 100. In 2017, Savage was featured on Post Malone's single, "Rockstar", which reached number one on the Hot 100, giving him his first chart-topping single. That same year, he appeared on Cardi B's single, "Bartier Cardi", which reached number 14 on the Hot 100. In 2021, he was featured alongside G Herbo and Lil Durk on another version of Nardo Wick's single, "Who Want Smoke?", titled "Who Want Smoke??" with an extra question mark in the title, which debuted at number 17 on the Hot 100. That same year, he appeared alongside Project Pat on Drake's single, "Knife Talk", which reached number four on the Hot 100. In 2022, Savage was featured alongside Tyler, the Creator on Pharrell Williams' single, "Cash in Cash Out", which debuted and peaked at number 26 on the Hot 100. That same year, he was featured on Drake's single, "Jimmy Cooks", which debuted and peaked atop the Hot 100, giving him his second chart-topping single.

Albums

Studio albums

Collaborative albums

Mixtapes

EPs

Singles

As lead artist

As featured artist

Other charted and certified songs

Guest appearances

Music videos

Production discography

2016
21 Savage and Metro Boomin – Savage Mode
03. "X" (featuring Future)

2017
21 Savage – Issa Album
02. "Bank Account"

Notes

References

Hip hop discographies